= Bertille Marcos Guèdègbé =

Beninese engineer and entrepreneur

Bertille Marcos Guèdègbé is a Beninese agricultural engineer and entrepreneur. She is President of the Cooperative of Benin's Pineapple Producers, Exporters, and Processors.

== Life ==
In 2014, she founded Network of Women Artisans of Benin. She is founder and CEO of the company Fruits Tillou. It is an exporter of pineapple and its products from Benin. She is farm management advisor on the CAGEA project. She founded of the GERME NGO.
